The following are the squad lists for the countries that played in the 1959 South American Championship held in Ecuador, the second edition of the tournament contested twice in a year.

The participating countries were Argentina, Brazil, Chile, Ecuador, Paraguay and Uruguay. Unlike the previous edition held that same year in Argentina, the participant teams brought reserve squads to the competition. Moreover, Brazilian roster included players from teams from Pernambuco state only, while Argentina brought younger or reserve players.

The teams played in a single round-robin tournament, earning two points for a win, one point for a draw, and zero points for a loss.

Argentina
Head Coach:  José Manuel Moreno

Brazil
Head Coach:  Gentil Cardoso

Ecuador
Head Coach:  Juan López Fontana

Paraguay 
Head Coach:

Uruguay
Head Coach:  Juan Carlos Corazzo

References

Squads
Copa América squads